Gobiobotia nicholsi is a species of small freshwater fish in the family Cyprinidae. It is endemic to China.

Named in honor of John Treadwell Nichols (1883-1958), curator of fishes at the American Museum of Natural History.

References

 

Gobiobotia
Taxa named by Petre Mihai Bănărescu
Taxa named by Teodor T. Nalbant
Fish described in 1966